The Flood is a 1994 French-Russian crime film directed by Igor Minaiev and starring Isabelle Huppert. It is based on the 1929 short story Navodneniye by Yevgeny Zamyatin. It was screened at the Locarno Festival in 1994.

Plot
The film takes place in Petrograd in the 1920s. Sofia (Isabelle Huppert) dreams of becoming a mother, hoping that with the birth of a child, husband Trofim (Boris Nevzorov) will not leave her. However, the woman can not conceive for a long time. One day a young neighbor, Ganka, who was left an orphan, appears in the couple's home. She begins to cohabit with Trofim, and his interest for his wife is completely lost. Taking advantage of a flood which came to pass, Sofia gets rid of her rival. Everyone believes that Ganka ran away from home. Meanwhile, Sofia is pregnant, and the relations of the spouses are improving. After giving birth to her daughter and during a fever, she tells how she killed Ganka with an ax.

Cast
 Isabelle Huppert - Sofia
 Boris Nevzorov - Trofim
 Svetlana Kryuchkova - Pelagiya
 Mariya Lipkina - Ganka (as Masha Lipkina)
 Vladimir Kuznetsov
 Mikhail Pyam
 Andrei Tolubeyev
 Fyodor Valikov
 Natalya Yegorova
 Aleksey Zaytsev

See also
 Isabelle Huppert on screen and stage

References

External links

1994 films
1990s French-language films
1994 crime films
Films based on works by Yevgeny Zamyatin
French crime films
Russian crime films
1990s French films